Ghananand Pande (1 January 1902 – before 1995) was an Indian scientist. He not only served at key positions in the Government of India but also made significant contribution towards nurture and education of young talents. He was honored with the highest civilian award of India, Padma Vibhushan in 1969.

Life
Born in a small town in Almora district, in what is today the state of Uttarakhand, Pande completed his primary and secondary schooling there. He then moved to Allahabad where he passed his undergraduate examination from Allahabad University in first division of 1922. He then did completed B.E. in Civil Engineering from Thomson College of Civil Engineering, Roorkee (now the IIT Roorkee) in 1925. Thereafter, he joined the Indian Railways as an engineer.

He performed his work in a distinctive manner and was soon appointed as General Manager of Mokameh Bridge over Ganga. He retired as the Chairman of the Railway Board and Secretary, Ministry of Railway in the Government of India after serving the post for three years in 1957. From 1958 to 1960 he was Chairman of the Steel Board and from 1961–1966, Vice-Chancellor of Roorkee University. Between 1966 and 1973 he worked in various senior positions in the Government of India.

Work
 During his tenure as the Chairman of Railway Board, three public sector steel plants at Bhilai, Rourkela and Durgapur were set up and commissioned under his supervision.
 He conceived the idea of Baby Car project, 1960–61 and recommended manufacture of small cars.
 He established The Institution of Engineers (India) at Roorkee University during his tenure as the Vice-chancellor.

Recognition
He was conferred the honorary degree of Doctor of Engineering by Roorkee University, and Doctor of Science by Kumaon University for his significant contribution towards education of aspiring students. He was also awarded Padma Vibhushan in 1969 for his Civil Service. He was nominated from state Uttar Pradesh.

References

1902 births
Year of death missing
Engineers from Uttarakhand
Indian civil engineers
IIT Roorkee alumni
Recipients of the Padma Vibhushan in civil service
20th-century Indian engineers
People from Almora district